Inmost is an puzzle-platform game developed by Hidden Layer Games and published by Chucklefish. It was released for iOS on October 11, 2019, and later ported to macOS, Microsoft Windows, Nintendo Switch, on August 21, 2020. The game follows a young girl, a knight, and a man in search of answers. These stories are interconnected to a creature which feeds on pain, and is set in two different worlds.

Reception 

Inmost received "generally favorable" reviews according to review aggregator Metacritic.

Notes

References

External links 
 

2019 video games
Apple Arcade games
Chucklefish games
Fantasy video games
IOS games
MacOS games
Metroidvania games
Nintendo Switch games
Puzzle-platform games
Side-scrolling video games
Single-player video games
Video games developed in Lithuania
Windows games